Bristlecone Wilderness is a  wilderness area in White Pine County, in the U.S. state of Nevada.  Located in the Egan Range approximately five miles west of the town of Mcgill, the Wilderness was created by the "White Pine County Conservation, Recreation and Development Act of 2006" and is administered by the U.S. Bureau of Land Management.

Vegetation in the Wilderness consists primarily of desert brush and grass at the lower elevations and a scattering of pinyon pine, juniper, and the namesake bristlecone pine stands on the upland slopes.  Groves of aspen exist in several washes, including Rattlesnake Canyon.

See also
 List of wilderness areas in Nevada
 List of U.S. Wilderness Areas
 Wilderness Act

References

External links
 Bristlecone Wilderness
 "Scientists Voice Their Overwhelming Support for Wilderness Designations in White Pine County, Nevada" by the Wilderness Society

Wilderness areas of Nevada
Protected areas of White Pine County, Nevada
Bureau of Land Management areas in Nevada